Vigevano Calcio, commonly referred to as Vigevano, is an Italian football club based in Vigevano, Lombardy.

In the season 2010–11, from Serie D group A relegated to Eccellenza Lombardy.

Its colors are light blue and white.

Previously known as Giovani Calciatori Vigevanesi, the team took part to 11 Serie B seasons, mainly in the 1930s and 1940s.

References
Vigevano Calcio, la storia

External links
Official homepage

Football clubs in Lombardy
Association football clubs established in 1921
Serie B clubs
Serie C clubs
Vigevano
1921 establishments in Italy
Vigevano Calcio